James McAlinden (27 December 1917 – 15 November 1993) was an Irish footballer who played as a forward for several clubs, most notably, Belfast Celtic, Portsmouth, Shamrock Rovers and Southend United. As an international, McAlinden also played for both Ireland teams – the IFA XI and the FAI XI. After retiring as a player, he went on to manage Glenavon, Distillery and Drogheda United.

Club career

Belfast Celtic
In 1934, aged 16, McAlinden was playing for Glentoran Reserves, when after a game against their reserves, he was offered a professional contract by Belfast Celtic. McAlinden, together with Jackie Vernon, Tommy Breen, Billy McMillan and Charlie Tully, subsequently became a prominent member of the Celtic team managed by Elisha Scott. This team dominated the Irish League in the era before and during the Second World War. Among his most notable contributions was scoring in the 2–1 win against Bangor in the 1938 Irish Cup final. After a spell with Portsmouth, McAlinden returned to Celtic in 1939, helping the club to further honours before leaving for Shamrock Rovers in 1945.

Portsmouth
In December 1938 McAlinden signed for Portsmouth for a fee of £7.500. He made his debut for the club against Chelsea and went onto became a regular in the side. Within six months of his arrival at the club, he helped them win the 1939 FA Cup Final, beating Wolves 4–1. After the outbreak of the Second World War, he played three times for Portsmouth in wartime regional leagues, but his first spell with the club ended when he then returned to Belfast Celtic. McAlinden returned to Portsmouth for a second spell in 1946. In September 1947 he left Portsmouth once again and joined Stoke City for a fee of £7,000.

Shamrock Rovers
Following the end of his second spell with Belfast Celtic and before he rejoined Portsmouth, McAlinden signed for Shamrock Rovers in September 1945. He made his debut against Shelbourne at Milltown on 16 September. While playing for Rovers his teammates included Paddy Coad, Peter Farrell and Tommy Eglington. During his one season with Rovers, McAlinden helped the club reach the 1946 FAI Cup final. However Rovers lost 3–1 to Drumcondra.

Stoke City
McAlinden joined Stoke City in September 1947 for a then club record fee of £7,000. He became regular inside forward under manager Bob McGrory in 1947–48 playing in 33 matches scoring just twice against Aston Villa and Huddersfield Town. His lack of goals saw him fall out of favour at the Victoria Ground and he was sold to Third Division South side Southend United in October 1948.

Southend United
In 1948 Southend United signed McAlinden from Stoke City for a fee of £8,000. He continued to play for United until 1954 and during his time with the club he served as club captain. He also became something of a cult hero among the club's fans and is remembered as being possibly the best player ever to play for the club. In 1950, McAlinden was caught up in controversy after it was alleged that he received illegal payments during his second spell with Portsmouth. As a result, he was suspended for the first two months of the 1950–51 season. In April 1954 he made his last home appearance for United in a 4–1 win over Queens Park Rangers.

International career
When McAlinden began his international career in 1937 there were in effect, two Ireland teams, chosen by two rival associations. Both associations, the Northern Ireland – based IFA and the Irish Free State – based FAI claimed jurisdiction over the whole of Ireland and selected players from the whole island. As a result, several notable Irish players from this era, including McAlinden played for both teams.

IFA XI
Between 1937 and 1948, McAlinden made 5 appearances for the IFA XI, making his international debut in a 1–1 draw with Scotland at Pittodrie Stadium on 10 November 1937. His IFA XI appearances also include the 8–4 defeat against a Combined Services XI at Windsor Park on 9 September 1944. This team was basically a Great Britain XI and featured, among others, Matt Busby, Stanley Matthews, Tommy Lawton and Stan Mortensen. He also played against England in 7–2 defeat at Windsor Park on 9 September 1946. He made his last appearance for the IFA XI on 10 October 1948 in a 6–2 defeat to England at Windsor Park. McAlinden made his first three appearances for the IFA XI while with Belfast Celtic, his fourth while at Portsmouth and his fifth while at Southend United

FAI XI
In 1946, while with Portsmouth, McAlinden also made 2 appearances for the FAI XI. He was one of several players born in Northern Ireland who benefited from the FAI's attempts to establish their all-Ireland influence. In June 1946 when the FAI organised an Iberian tour, McAlinden, together with Jackie Vernon, Billy McMillan and Paddy Sloan, was one of four Northern Irish players called up. McAlinden subsequently played in both the 3–1 defeat to Portugal on 16 June and then helped Ireland gain a surprise 1–0 victory against Spain on 23 June 1946.

Coaching career
In 1955 McAlinden became player/manager of Glenavon. He continued playing for a further year before finally retiring as a player to concentrate on management. During a thirteen-year spell with Glenavon he guided them two Irish League titles, three Irish Cup victories and one Gold Cup. After leaving Glenavon, McAlinden worked as a full-time scout for Coventry City before taking charge at Distillery in 1969. He subsequently guided a Distillery team that included a young Martin O'Neill to a win in the 1971 Irish Cup. Later in his first season with Drogheda United he guided them to the 1976 FAI Cup final, only to lose 1–0 to Bohemians.

Career statistics

Club
Sourced from

International
Source:

Honours

Player
Belfast Celtic
Irish League 
Winners 1935–36, 1936–37, 1937–38, 1939–40, 1940–41, 1941–42, 1943–44: 7
Irish Cup:
Winners 1938, 1941, 1943: 3
Gold Cup
Winners 1934–35, 1939–40, 1940–41, 1943–44, 1944–45: 5
County Antrim Shield
Winners 1935–36, 1936–37, 1942–43, 1944–45: 4

Shamrock Rovers
Inter-City Cups: 1
Winners 1946

Portsmouth
 FA Cup
Winners 1939: 1

Manager
Glenavon
Irish League
Winners 1956–57, 1959–60: 2
Irish Cup:
Winners 1957, 1959, 1961: 3
Gold Cup
Winners : 1956–57 1

Distillery
Irish Cup:
Winners 1971: 1
Runners Up 1969: 1

Drogheda United
FAI Cup
Runners Up 1976: 1

References
 Specific

 General

The Boys in Green – The FAI International Story (1997): Sean Ryan
Soccer at War – 1939 – 45 (2005): Jack Rollin

External links
Southend United fansite
 Ireland (FAI) stats

1917 births
1993 deaths
Association footballers from Northern Ireland
Belfast Celtic F.C. players
Dual Irish international footballers
League of Ireland managers
League of Ireland players
Association football forwards
Glenavon F.C. players
Ireland (FAI) international footballers
NIFL Premiership players
Republic of Ireland international footballers from Northern Ireland
Football managers from Northern Ireland
Association footballers from Belfast
Portsmouth F.C. players
Pre-1950 IFA international footballers
Shamrock Rovers F.C. players
Southend United F.C. players
Stoke City F.C. players
English Football League players
Drogheda United F.C. managers
Glenavon F.C. managers
Lisburn Distillery F.C. managers
Place of death missing
League of Ireland XI players
FA Cup Final players